The 1911 Boston Rustlers season was the 41st season of the franchise. With George Dovey having died in 1909, John Dovey sold the Boston Doves team after the 1910 season to John P. Harris. One month after purchasing the team, Harris sold it to William Hepburn Russell, who changed the team name to the Boston Rustlers and brought back former manager Fred Tenney.  Tenney's retirement at the end of the season marked the end of an era, as he was the last player to have been a part of the 1890s dynasty teams. In spite of their 44-107 record, four players managed to hit over .300 for the season (Buck Herzog and Mike Donlin hit over .300 in part-time roles) led by Doc Miller, who hit .333. Bill Sweeney was the other full-time regular besides Miller to hit over .300, finishing at .314 for the season.

Regular season 
 May 22, 1911: Boston pitcher Cliff Curtis lost his 23rd game in a row, dating back to 1910, still the all-time record for consecutive losses by a pitcher.
 October 6, 1911: Boston pitcher Cy Young loses his final game (and third in a row) against the Brooklyn Dodgers at Washington Park.  Young's 511th and final win came two weeks prior at Pittsburgh's Forbes Field.

Season standings

Record vs. opponents

Roster

Player stats

Batting

Starters by position 
Note: Pos = Position; G = Games played; AB = At bats; H = Hits; Avg. = Batting average; HR = Home runs; RBI = Runs batted in

Other batters 
Note: G = Games played; AB = At bats; H = Hits; Avg. = Batting average; HR = Home runs; RBI = Runs batted in

Pitching

Starting pitchers 
Note: G = Games pitched; IP = Innings pitched; W = Wins; L = Losses; ERA = Earned run average; SO = Strikeouts

Other pitchers 
Note: G = Games pitched; IP = Innings pitched; W = Wins; L = Losses; ERA = Earned run average; SO = Strikeouts

Relief pitchers 
Note: G = Games pitched; W = Wins; L = Losses; SV = Saves; ERA = Earned run average; SO = Strikeouts

See also
List of worst Major League Baseball season records

References

External links
1911 Boston Rustlers season at Baseball Reference

Boston Rustlers seasons
Boston Rustlers
Boston Rustlers
1910s in Boston